The 2014–15 Chattanooga Mocs basketball team represented the University of Tennessee at Chattanooga during the 2014–15 NCAA Division I men's basketball season. The Mocs, led by second year head coach Will Wade, played their home games at the McKenzie Arena and were members of the Southern Conference. They finished the season 22–10, 15–3 in SoCon play to finish in second place. They lost in the quarterfinals of the SoCon tournament to Furman. Despite having 22 wins, they did not participate in a postseason tournament.

On April 7, head coach Will Wade resigned to become the head coach at VCU. He finished at Chattanooga with a two-year record of 40–25.

Roster

Schedule

|-
!colspan=9 style="background:#00386B; color:#E0AA0F;"| Regular season

|-
!colspan=9 style="background:#00386B; color:#E0AA0F;"| SoCon tournament

See also
 2014-15 Chattanooga Mocs women's basketball

References

Chattanooga Mocs men's basketball seasons
Chattanooga
Chattanooga Mocs
Chattanooga Mocs